Bourda cricket ground in Georgetown, Guyana hosted international cricket matches between 1930 and 2006. The ground is also known as Georgetown Cricket Club. It hosted 30 Test matches and 11 One Day Internationals, all with the West Indies cricket team as the home side. A new stadium, Providence Stadium, was built in Guyana as a replacement for Bourda ahead of the 2007 Cricket World Cup which was hosted by the West Indies. No international cricket has been played at Bourda since then.

In cricket, a five-wicket haul (also known as a "five-for" or "fifer") refers to a bowler taking five or more wickets in a single innings. This is regarded as a notable achievement. This article details the five-wicket hauls taken on the ground in official international Test and One Day International (ODI) matches.

West Indian Learie Constantine took the first five-wicket haul on the ground, taking five wickets for 87 runs (5/87) against England in the first Test match played on the ground in 1930. The best innings bowling figures on the ground are Australian Ian Johnson's 7/44 taken in 1955 whilst Pakistan's bowler Imran Khan has the best bowling figures in a match, taking 11/21, including a five-wicket haul, in 1988.

Key

Test match five-wicket hauls
A total of 21 five-wicket hauls were taken on the ground, all of them in men's Test matches.

Notes

References

External links
International five-wicket hauls at Bourda, CricInfo

Bourda
West Indian cricket lists